Ayşe Çağırır (born January 1, 1995) is a Turkish female boxer competing in the light flyweight (48 kg) division. She is a European Championship bronze medalist.

Boxing career
In 2014 she won a bronze medal at the European Championships in Bucharest. After two point victories in the 1/8 finals and the quarterfinals, Çağırır lost in the semifinals to the representative of Bulgaria Sevda Asenova. In November of the same year, she represented Turkey at the World Championships in Jeju, where she fell in the 1/8 finals.

On 19 May 2022, Çağırır won the gold medal in the 48 kg category at the Women's World Championship defeating Kazakhstan's Alua Balkibekova in the minimumweight final in Istanbul, Turkey.

References

External links

1995 births
Living people
People from Bağcılar
Sportspeople from Istanbul
Turkish women boxers
Light-flyweight boxers
AIBA Women's World Boxing Championships medalists
Competitors at the 2022 Mediterranean Games
Mediterranean Games silver medalists for Turkey
Mediterranean Games medalists in boxing
20th-century Turkish sportswomen
21st-century Turkish sportswomen